The 1939 National Football League All-star Game was the professional football league's first-ever all-star game, sponsored by the Los Angeles Times as a charity game to benefit the Salvation Army. It pitted the New York Giants, the league's champion for the 1938 season, against a team of all-stars. The game was played on Sunday, January 15, 1939, at Wrigley Field in Los Angeles, California in front of 15,000 fans; although 30,000 spectators were expected, bad weather led to the poor attendance. The Giants defeated the all-stars by a score of 13–10.

The players on the all-star squad were selected by fan balloting. For the only time in the game's history, players from teams outside the NFL were invited; five players from the Los Angeles Bulldogs and Hollywood Stars, two local teams in what would eventually become the Pacific Coast Professional Football League, were among the members of the All-Star team.

Rosters
The players involved in this game were:

All-American All-Stars roster

New York Giants roster

References

Pro Bowl
All-Star Game
National Football League All-Star Game
National Football League All-Star Game
1939 in Los Angeles
National Football League in Los Angeles
New York Giants
January 1939 sports events